Victorio (c. 1825–1880), was a warrior and chief of the Apaches in and around Texas and New Mexico.

Victorio may also refer to:

People

First name

Politics
 Victorio Codovilla (1894–1970), Italian-born Argentine socialist and later communist politician
 Victorio Montalvo Rojas (born 1966), Mexican lawyer and politician
 Victorio Taccetti (1943), Argentine career diplomat

Sports
 Victorio Casa (1943–2013), Argentine professional footballer
 Victorio Cieslinskas (1922–2007), Uruguayan basketball player of Lithuanian descent
 Victorio Cocco (born 1946), Argentine footballer
 Victório Ferraz (1924–2006), Brazilian competitive sailor
 Victorio Ruiz García (1926–unknown), Spanish racing cyclist
 Victorio Ocaño (born 1954), Argentine footballer
 Victorio "Maxi" Pereira (born 1984), Uruguayan footballer
 Victorio Ramis (born 1994), Argentine footballer
 Víctorio Solares (born 1932), Guatemalan middle-distance runner
 Victorio Spinetto (1911–1990), Argentine football player and manager
 Victorio Unamuno (1909–1988), Spanish footballer

Other fields
 Victorio Blanco (1893–1977), Mexican film actor
 Victorio Edades (1895–1985), Filipino painter
 Victorio Macho (1887–1966), Spanish sculptor
 Victorio Riego Prieto (1932–2009), Paraguayan chess player

Middle name
 Lucio Victorio Mansilla (1831–1913), Argentinean general, journalist, politician and diplomat

Other uses
 Victorio Peak, a high rocky outcropping in the Hembrillo Basin in southern New Mexico
 Victorio Peak Formation, a geologic formation found in the Delaware Basin in Texas and New Mexico
 Victorio Peak treasure, a cache of gold reportedly found inside Victorio Peak in 1937
 Victorio's War, an armed conflict that took place 1879–1880

See also
 
 Victoria (disambiguation)